Gunanand Dangwal (1914 or 1915 – 2000), better known by his nom de plume Pathik was an Indian freedom fighter who played a leading role in the Tehri uprising.

He is known for his translation of Ramayana to Garhwali Ramayana (called Garh Bhasha Lila Ramayan), making it easier to be used in plays (Ramlila) in Garhwal region and compositions of folk and patriotic folk songs. Poet Manglesh Dabral has written in his poems about Pathik being a Marxist, who was present at Communist rallies and made some of his revolutionary songs on folk tunes.

Pathik died in 2000, at the age of 85 and is survived by his wife, Manorama, two sons and two daughters

References 

People from New Tehri
People from Tehri Garhwal district
Indian revolutionaries
Indian Marxists
20th-century Indian translators
Uttarakhand politicians
Year of birth uncertain
2000 deaths